Václav Winter (born 18 August 1976) is a Czech football player, who currently plays for Bohemians Prague as a goalkeeper.

References

External links
 
 Profile at gambrinusliga.cz 
 Profile at FC Vysočina Jihlava website 

1976 births
Living people
Czech footballers
Association football goalkeepers
Czech First League players
SK Slavia Prague players
AFK Atlantic Lázně Bohdaneč players
SK Kladno players
FK Bohemians Prague (Střížkov) players
FC Vysočina Jihlava players